The Golden Knights is the United States open correspondence chess championship.  It is held annually by the United States Chess Federation (USCF), and is open to all members of the USCF residing in the United States or who have an APO or FPO address. It was first held in 1943 under the name Victory Tournament, the next year it was called the Postal Chess Championship and in 1945 it was finally renamed as the Golden Knights tournament. The 69th annual Golden Knights tournament began in 2016.  About 200 players typically participate in each tournament.

The tournament is played in three stages: the preliminaries, semi-finals, and finals.  At each stage, the participants are divided into a number of seven-player sections, with each participant playing one game (three with White, three with Black) against every other player in the section.  Each participant plays in the preliminaries, playing in a section with players having a wide range of ratings.  The top finishers in the preliminaries advance to the semi-finals.  The top players in the semi-finals advance to the finals. A score of 5-1 or better was previously required to advance from the preliminaries to the semi-finals, or from the semi-finals to the finals, but since at least the 2001 tournament, 4.5 points has been sufficient. A player's score is determined by her weighted-point total, which is determined by multiplying her score at each stage by a coefficient that weighs later results more heavily than earlier results. The coefficient used for each point in the finals (4.5) is slightly more than twice that used for each point in the semi-finals (2.2), which is slightly more than twice that used for each point in the preliminaries (1). Thus, a player who wins all of his games except for one draw in the preliminaries will have a higher weighted-point total (45.70) than a player who won all of his games except for a draw in the semi-finals (45.10), and both of those players will have a lower weighted-point total than a player who won all of his games except for a draw in the finals (43.55). The weighted-point system ensures that no player will be able to coast home with a series of draws, and enables a player who is behind to make up a lot of ground with a strong result in the finals.

Golden Knights Champions
{| class="sortable wikitable"
! # !! Year !! Winner 
|-
| -||1943||John H. Staffer 
|-
| -||1944||Marvin C. Palmer     
|-
| 1||1945||Charles F. Rehberg   
|-
| 2||1946||Richard L. Aikin
|-
| 3||1947-1948||Leon Stolzenberg
|-
| 4||1949||James T. Sherwin
|-
| 5||1950||Leon Stolzenberg
|-
| 6||1951||John H. Staffer
|-
| 7||1952-1953||Ignaz Zalys
|-
| 8||1954||Reuben Klugman
|-
| 9||1955||Hans Berliner
|-
| 10||1956||Hans Berliner
|-
| 11||1957||Raymond Doe
|-
| 12||1958||J. Whiteczak
|-
| 13||1959||Hans Berliner
|-
| 14||1960||Leon Stolzenberg
|-
| 15||1961-1962||Lionel B. Joyner
|-
| 16||1963||Gary R. Abram
|-
| 17||1964||Anton Sildmets
|-
| 18||1965||Brian E. Owens
|-
| 19||1966||Harry Mayer
|-
| 20||1967||William F. Gray
|-
| 21||1968||Kenneth Collins
|-
| 22||1969||Robert H. Burns
|-
| 23||1970||Juris Jurevics
|-
| 24||1971||Robert G. Cross
|-
| 25||1972||Richard A. Cayford
|-
| 26||1973||Bill Maillard  Richard Cayford  George Krauss
|-
| 27||1974||Ben Bednarz
|-
| 28||1975||Rob Salgado
|-
| 29||1976||K. Redinger
|-
| 30||1977||Tom Sweeney
|-
| 31||1978||Richard Aiken  Walter Milbratz
|-
| 32||1979||Tom Friedel
|-
| 33||1980||Gary Kubach
|-
| 34||1981||Tom Friedel
|-
| 35||1982||S. Kowalski  S. Sinding  Meeks Vaughan
|-
| 36||1983||Rob Salgado
|-
| 37||1984||Edmund Hermelyn
|-
| 38||1985||Andre Reichman
|-
| 39||1986||Mike Colucci  George Kirby  J. Timms
|-
| 40||1987||Stanley J. Elowitch
|-
| 41||1988||Michael P. Decker
|-
| 42||1989||Jon Applebee
|-
| 43||1990||Murray Kurtz  John Penquite
|-
| 44||1991||Joseph A. Schwing
|-
| 45||1992||Edward P. Duliba  Charles Van Buskirk
|-
| 46||1993||Anthony D. Eaker
|-
| 47||1994||Robert B. Ilderton
|-
| 48||1995||Robert F. Keating
|-
| 49||1996||Robert F. Keating
|-
| 50||1997||Chris O'Connell
|-
| 51||1998||Leonard "Corky" Schakel
|-
| 52||1999||John Burton
|-
| 53||2000||Abe Wilson
|-
| 54||2001||John Burton
|-
| 55||2002||Chuck Cullum
|-
| 56||2003||John Menke
|-
| 57||2004||Chuck Cullum
|-
| 58||2005||Abe Wilson 
|-
| 59||2006||Michael Buss  James Tracz
|-
| 60||2007||Daniel Woodard
|-
| 61||2008|| James Rhodes
|-
| 62||2009||Wilbur Tseng
|-
| 63||2010||Michael Buss
|-
| 64||2011||James Tracz
|-
| 65||2012||Michael Buss
|-
| 66||2013||Gary Adams
|-
|}

References
 USCF homepage
 USCF 2006 Yearbook

Notes

Chess competitions
Chess in the United States
1943 establishments in the United States
Recurring events established in 1943